Lachlan may refer to:

People
 Lachlan (name), masculine name.

Places
 Several places in New South Wales, Australia, named for Lachlan Macquarie.  For a more complete list, see Places named after Macquarie
 Electoral district of Lachlan, an electoral district of the Legislative Assembly in New South Wales, Australia
 Electoral district of Lachlan and Lower Darling, an electoral district of the Legislative Assembly in New South Wales, Australia
 Lachlan River, a river in central New South Wales, Australia
 Lachlan Shire, a local government area in the central west of New South Wales, Australia
 Lachlan Valley Railway, a rail preservation society based at Cowra, New South Wales, Australia
 Lachlan Valley Way, a state highway in New South Wales, Australia
 Upper Lachlan Shire, a local government area in the state of New South Wales, Australia
 Lachlan, Tasmania, a locality
 Lachlan Fold Belt 
 Lachlan Island

Other
 Clan Maclachlan, a Scottish clan which is sometimes known as Clan Lachlan
 HMAS Lachlan (K364), a River-class frigate that served the Royal Australian Navy
 Young Lachlan, a schooner that was stolen and wrecked by convicts in 1819